Frederick "Fred" Gleave was an English professional rugby league footballer who played in the 1900s and 1910s.

Playing career

International honours
Fred Gleave won a cap for England while at Wigan in 1913 against Wales.

County Cup Final appearances
Fred Gleave played  in Wigan's 10-9 victory over Oldham in the 1908 Lancashire County Cup Final during the 1908–09 season at Wheater's Field, Broughton, on Saturday 19 December 1908, and played  in the 21-5 victory over Rochdale Hornets in the 1912 Lancashire County Cup Final during the 1912–13 season at Weaste, Salford, on Wednesday 11 December 1912.

References

External links
Statistics at wigan.rlfans.com

England national rugby league team players
English rugby league players
Place of birth missing
Place of death missing
Rugby league five-eighths
Wigan Warriors players
Year of birth missing
Year of death missing